Millennium Wood is a 3.8 hectare Local Nature Reserve on the southern outskirts of Ipswich in Suffolk. It is owned by Suffolk County Council  and managed by the Greenways Countryside Project.

New saplings have been planted on the edge of this ancient, semi-natural wood of hornbeam and coppiced lime. There are many flowers in the spring such as bluebells, wild garlic and archangel.

There is access from Bobbits Lane.

References

Local Nature Reserves in Suffolk
Ipswich
Forests and woodlands of Suffolk